Confédération générale du travail du Burkina ('General Confederation of Labour of Burkina', abbreviated CGT-B) is a revolutionary national trade union centre in Burkina Faso. Bassolma Bazié the general secretary of CGT-B.

History

CGT-B was founded by eight trade unions at its first congress held October 28–29, 1988 by eight trade unions. CGT-B emerged from the Trade Union Front (Front Syndical) formed by autonomous trade unions on January 28, 1985. The Trade Union Front had been formed in order to coordinate labour resistance to the repression of the Thomas Sankara government.

At the time of its foundation CGTB began to challenge the hegemony of the Confédération Syndicale Burkinabé of Soumané Touré in the Burkinabè labour movement, and the new trade union centre became a dominant player in trade union activism in the country. When the Structural Adjustment Programmes were introduced in Burkina Faso, CGT-B opposed them.

CGT-B consists of 12 national trade union and 70 company trade unions. The organization has 28 provincial unions. The oldest of its affiliated unions is the bakers' union, Fédération nationale des boulangers et pâtissiers du Burkina (FNBPB), founded in 1960. Another affiliate, SYNTSHA (a trade union of health workers) led various several strikes in the public health sector in the 1990s.

After the murder of Norbert Zongo in 1998, CGTB took part in the founding of the Collective of Democratic Mass Organizations and Political Parties. Tolé Sagnon of CGT-B became one of the vice presidents of the Collective.

At several times, CGTB and its leaders has been subject to harassment and threats.

In 2008, CGT-B took part in the protests against high cost of living.

Affiliated unions
Fédération Nationale des Boulangers et Pâtissiers du Burkina
Syndicat National des Travailleurs de la Santé Humaine et Animale
Syndicat National des Agents des Impôts et des Domaines
Syndicat National des Travailleurs de l'Education et de la Recherche
Syndicat des Travailleurs de la Géologie, des Mines et Hydrocarbures
Syndicat national des Travailleurs des Brasseries
Syndicat des Travailleurs des Travaux publics, du Bâtiment, de l'Hydraulique et Assimilés
Syndicat National des Travailleurs de l'Environnement, du Tourisme et de l'Hôtelerie
Syndicat National des travailleurs du Textile
Syndicat National des Travailleurs de l'Agriculture
Syndicat National des Agents du Conseil Burkinabè des Chargeurs
Syndicat National des Travailleurs de la Planification et de la Coopération

References

Trade unions in Burkina Faso
Trade unions established in 1988
Burkina Faso
Revolutionary Syndicalism